Quelque chose de France is a French-language studio album by Julio Iglesias, released in 2007 on Columbia (Sony BMG).

Track listing

Charts

References 

2007 albums
Julio Iglesias albums
Columbia Records albums